Eastern Washington University Press (EWU Press) was a publishing house formed in the 1970s that was a part of Eastern Washington University. The press specialized in scholarly works about Asia and the environment; it also released works of fiction and translation of literature, including works by poets and writers such as Robert Bly, Carolyn Kizer, Dorianne Laux, and Joseph Millar.

In 2007, Eastern Washington University Press became a member of the Association of American University Presses. On June 30, 2010, the press ceased operation, and the publishing rights to many of its books were transferred to Carnegie Mellon University Press.

See also
 List of English-language book publishing companies
 List of university presses

References

External links
 Eastern Washington University Press

Press
University presses of the United States
Publishing companies established in the 1970s
Book publishing companies based in Washington (state)